Ikkyū-san may refer to:
 Ikkyū-san (TV series), a historical anime series produced by Toei Animation
 Ikkyū-san (manga), a baseball manga written and illustrated by Shinji Mizushima